The Chicago Steam is a basketball team of the American Basketball Association. Founded in 2007, the Steam first played in the 2008-09 ABA season. Based in the Chicago suburb of South Holland, Illinois, the Steam plays its home games at South Suburban College.

History
In February 2013, a player for Steam women's team filed a lawsuit against team owner Ron Hicks over taking money for a trip which never occurred then keeping the money. Many other former players made complaints over failure to be paid or paying for trips which never occurred.

References

External links
Chicago Steam Basketball official website

2008 establishments in Illinois
American Basketball Association (2000–present) teams
Steam
South Holland, Illinois
Basketball teams established in 2008